An ode is a form of stately and elaborate lyrical verse.

Ode may also refer to:

Arts

Music
 Ode (Brad Mehldau album)
 Ode (London Jazz Composers' Orchestra album)
 Ode (Stravinsky), an orchestral work by Igor Stravinsky (1943) and a ballet to its music by Lorca Massine (1972)
 Ode Records, an American record label
 Ode Records (New Zealand), a New Zealand record label
 An Ode, a 2019 album by South Korean boy band Seventeen
 "Ode", a song by Soul Asylum from their 1988 album Hang Time
 "Ode", a song by Creed from their 1997 album My Own Prison
 "Ode", a song by Mono from their 2004 album Walking Cloud and Deep Red Sky, Flag Fluttered and the Sun Shined

Other arts
 Ode (Nabokov), a ballet by Nicolas Nabokov and Léonide Massine (Ballets Russes, 1928)
 "Ode" (poem), a poem by Arthur O'Shaughnessy
 The Ode, a 2008 film by Nilanjan Neil Lahiri (sometimes just Ode)
 Ode, a 2017 film from Nathaniel Dorsky's Arboretum Cycle

Acronyms
 Ohio Department of Education, the state education agency of Ohio
 Omicron Delta Epsilon, an international honor society in the field of economics
 Open Dynamics Engine, a real-time physics engine
 Ordinary differential equation, a mathematical concept
 Apache ODE, a web-services orchestration engine from the Apache Software Foundation
 Open Development Environment, software cross-platform build tooling from Open Software Foundation

Other
 Odic force or odes, a hypothetical vital energy or life force 
 Ode, Gujarat, a city in Gujarat, India
 Ode to Aphrodite, an ode to the goddess Aphrodite
 Ode, one of the Biblical canticles or songs in Eastern Orthodox canon

See also

 
 ODE (disambiguation)
 Odes (disambiguation)

de:ODE
it:ODE
lv:Oda (nozīmju atdalīšana)
pt:ODE